Someklu (also Romanized as Someklū) is a village in Kolah Boz-e Sharqi Rural District, in the Central District of Meyaneh County, East Azerbaijan Province, Iran. At the 2006 census, its population was 30, in 8 families.

References 

Populated places in Meyaneh County